Rule High School was  a public high school in Knoxville, Tennessee. It opened in 1927 and closed in 1991.

History
The school was named after Knoxville newspaper editor Captain William Rule (1839–1928). When it originally opened in the fall of 1927, it was an elementary-junior high school with 525 students enrolled in the elementary grades and 261 in the junior high and high school grades. Lower grades were dropped year after year, until eventually the school just had grades 7–9.

An effort was made to append a grade 12 to the school curriculum, however that initially fell through. On April 14, 1937, 600 students from grades seven through 11, wanting a 12th grade, staged a walkout protest. The protest was reported on the front page of the New York Times. On May 9, 1938, the school board decided to add a 12th grade. The first 12th grade class, consisting of 31 students, graduated in 1939.

The school was inactivated on March 24, 2000.

Rule High School was closed in 1991. Although the building is in bad shape it is still standing today.
Mary C. Hodge Halsey wrote the book, "Golden Memories of Rule High School - A History." It is a 426-page book with pictures, copies of school programs, and stories of faculty members and students.

Notable alumni
Mike Cofer, former NFL linebacker for the Detroit Lions and player for the Tennessee Volunteers

References

Schools in Knoxville, Tennessee
Educational institutions established in 1927
Educational institutions disestablished in 1991
Defunct schools in Tennessee
1927 establishments in Tennessee